Puzpalak (also Romanized as Pūzpalak) is a village in Gavkan Rural District, in the Central District of Rigan County, Kerman Province, Iran. At the 2006 census, its population was 41, in 11 families.

References 

Populated places in Rigan County